Isoxazolines are a class of five-membered heterocyclic chemical compounds, containing one atom each of oxygen and nitrogen which are located adjacent to one another. The ring was named in-line with the Hantzsch–Widman nomenclature. They are structural isomers of the more common oxazolines and exist in three different isomers depending on the location of the double bond. The relatively weak N-O bond makes isoxazolines prone to ring-opening and rearrangement reactions.

Compounds containing an isoxazoline ring, sometimes referred to isoxazolyls, have a variety of uses with many being biologically active. A number of naturally occurring isoxazolines with possible anti-cancer activity are produced by marine sponges. Perhaps the most commonly encountered products containing isoxazolines are some veterinary medicines used to prevent flea infestations in dogs e.g. Fluralaner, Afoxolaner and Sarolaner.

Synthesis
2-Isoxazolines are generally produced by the 1,3-dipolar cycloaddition of nitrile oxides with alkenes. This has been applied in a diastereoselective manner in the synthesis of epothilones.

3-isoxazolines are prepared from 2-isoxazolines via their N-methylation to form 2-isoxazolinium salts, followed by nucleophilic attack and deprotonation.

4-Isoxazolines are most commonly produced by (3+2) cycloaddition between a nitrone and an alkyne. This can be considered an extension of the more common nitrone-olefin (3+2) cycloaddition used for creating isoxazolidines.

See also
 Isoxazole
 1,2-Benzisoxazole

References